Konopište is a village in the Municipality of Kavadarci, situated in the center of the vinegary region of Tikveš, North Macedonia. Until 2004, it was the seat of Konopište Municipality.

Geography
It is the home to Gorska Voda, a company that bottles water and soft drink products in North Macedonia.  Konopište has many geomorphic stone dolls, but they were formed from a different geological process than the Stone Dolls found in Kratovo. Konopište is in the valley of both the Kožuf and Kozjak mountains and over 20 mountain rivers and streams flow through the area.  Gorska gets its water from the Trnskot spring.  40 species of rare birds live in the area and a larger part of the Kožuf mountain and Tikveš region are part of a natural reserve protecting these endangered animals and their habitats.  There is a colony of bald eagles that resides here, the only known colony in all of Europe.  While many other animals make their habitat in the Konopište, only boar and rabbit hunting are permitted.  Some natural resources and minerals are mined near here and have been since ancient times. Despite its natural wonder, very few people live in the village itself making the area one of the least populated in all of North Macedonia.  The village church St. Stefan has rare life-size icons that date back over  100 years, while the smaller and modern St. Atanas church is a nice edition to the village.  Like many villages, there is a World War II monument to the fallen soldiers from the village.  Roads to the village include from Kavadarci and Demir Kapija.

Demographics
According to the 2002 census, the village had a total of 55 inhabitants. Ethnic groups in the village include:

Macedonians 55

References

Notes

Villages in Kavadarci Municipality